Nord-Fugløya or Fugløya is an uninhabited island in Karlsøy Municipality in Troms og Finnmark, Norway. Fugløykalven Lighthouse is located north of the island.

Nature reserve
The whole island is protected as a nature reserve which, along with the adjacent marine waters, has also been designated an Important Bird Area (IBA) by BirdLife International because it supports large breeding colonies of Atlantic puffins and razorbills.

See also
List of islands of Norway

References

Karlsøy
Uninhabited islands of Norway
Islands of Troms og Finnmark
Nature reserves in Norway
Important Bird Areas of Norway
Important Bird Areas of Arctic islands
Seabird colonies